Jan van Londerseel (Antwerp, between 1570 and 1575  - Rotterdam, 1624–25) was a Flemish draughtsman, engraver, etcher and print maker. After training and working in Antwerp he was active in the Dutch Republic during the latter part of his career.

Life
Jan van Londerseel was probably a pupil of Abraham de Bruyn in Antwerp. Van Londerseel married a niece of his master Abraham de Bruyn.  His wife's brother Nicolaes de Bruyn was another Flemish engraver who made a name in the Dutch Republic.

Around 1600 Jan followed his brother Assuerus van Londerseel, also an engraver, to Rotterdam. He lived in 1614 in Delft.  He was mainly active in Rotterdam where he is believed to have died before 7 January 1625.

Londerseel had at least one son, Johannes van Londerseel the younger, who also became an engraver and by whom only one engraving is known.

Work

The majority of his work consists of landscapes, in which he shows a preference for picturesque details, such as gnarled trees. The engravings emphasise the contrast between black and white in the foreground and the backgrounds which are pale and lightly etched.  Londerseel displays herein a strong influence from his brother-in-law Nicolaes de Bruyn.  He also made a number of engravings after the architectural paintings of Hendrick Aerts.  A remarkable piece is the Bird's Eye View of The Hague and Scheveningen from the North-East made in collaboration with Nicolaes de Clerck in 1614.  It is a very large engraving on two plates that shows the two cities The Hague and Scheveningen in amazing detail.

He made engravings after the works of famous Flemish and Dutch painters of his time, including Gillis van Coninxloo, Hendrick Aerts, David Vinckboons, Maerten de Vos and Gillis d'Hondecoeter.

Londerseel printed and published his own works. Claes Jansz. Visscher produced later editions of many of his engravings.

References

External links

1570s births
1624 deaths
17th-century engravers
Flemish engravers
Artists from Antwerp
Artists from Rotterdam
Dutch engravers